Clé 2: Yellow Wood is the first special album and fifth extended play by South Korean boy group Stray Kids. It was released digitally and physically on June 19, 2019, by JYP Entertainment and distributed through Dreamus. The album consists of three new songs, including the single "부작용 (Side Effects)", alongside all four "Mixtape" songs, available previously only on the physical CD releases of their previous four EPs. This is the last release to feature former member Woojin, following their departure at the end of October 2019.

Track listing

Charts

Weekly charts

Year-end charts

Certifications

Accolades

Notes

References 

2019 EPs
JYP Entertainment EPs
IRiver EPs
Korean-language EPs
Sequel albums
Stray Kids EPs